Iruvar is a 1997 Indian Tamil-language epic political drama film co-written, produced and directed by Mani Ratnam. The film, inspired by the lives of M. Karunanidhi, M. G. Ramachandran and J. Jayalalithaa is set against the backdrop of cinema and politics in Tamil Nadu. It stars an ensemble cast including Mohanlal, Prakash Raj, Aishwarya Rai, Revathi, Gautami, Tabu and Nassar. Rai, who was crowned Miss World 1994, made her screen debut through the film, playing dual characters.

The high-budget film had its original soundtrack composed by A. R. Rahman and the cinematography was by Santosh Sivan. This film marked Mohanlal's debut in Tamil cinema after having only a cameo in Gopura Vasalile.

The film was screened in the Masters section at the 1997 Toronto International Film Festival. Iruvar went on to become a critical success winning the Best Film award at the Belgrade International Film Festival and two National Film Awards. In 2012, Iruvar was included by critic Rachel Dwyer in the 2012 British Film Institute Sight & Sound 1000 greatest films of all time. In a 2013 interview, Ratnam said he considered Iruvar as his best film. It used DTS 6 track sound recording.

Plot 
In the late 1940s, Anandan, an aspiring actor, goes around studios trying to land roles. He meets Tamizhselvan, a rationalist writer he respects, steeped in Dravidian ideas. On the strength of Tamizhselvan's flowery writing and his own impassioned delivery, he is offered the title role in a few films.

Tamizhselvan introduces Anandan to Ayya Veluthambi, who leads a Dravidian political party. He grows to like the party's ideology. Anandan marries Pushpavalli, while Tamizhselvan marries Maragatham, from their respective villages. When the two return to Madras, Anandan's film has been cancelled due to financial difficulties and Tamizhselvan's party has become the main opposition party. Anandan is reduced to playing minor roles. He sends Pushpavalli back to their village and considers joining the army. Pushpavalli dies from illness and Tamizhselvan consoles Anandan.

Anandan's fortunes turn and he is again offered the part of a hero. He convinces the director to hire Tamizhselvan as screenwriter. The film receives tremendous response upon release. Tamizhselvan encourages Anandan to use his popularity to help their party gain more attention. Anandan marries Ramani. Ayya Veluthambi asks Anandan to contest in the upcoming elections, much to the displeasure of Tamizhselvan, who thinks other, more devoted workers deserve the candidacy.

Anandan is shot in neck by a prop gun while filming a scene, but the party sweeps elections, with 152 seats out of 234. Ayya Veluthambi refuses to become chief minister. He asks Anandan and another leader, Madhivannan, to decide who should be given the post. Tamizhselvan is resentful that Veluthambi did not involve him, but is chosen to be the chief minister with Anandan's wholehearted support. Anandan later asks to be the health minister, but Tamizhselvan refuses, on the pretext that the executive committee forbids ministers to pursue acting while in office. He offers Anandan any portfolio of his choice on the condition that he suspend his acting career. Anandan does not take it up.

Senthamarai, who had admired Tamizhselvan's daring protests, moves in with him when he writes her a poetic letter and has a daughter with him. Anandan's co-star in his new film is Kalpana who resembles his late wife. While initially distant, Kalpana's chattiness draws Anandan to her. But his indecision about another marriage, Ramani still being his wife, angers Kalpana and she leaves him.

In a memorial function on Ayya Veluthambi's death, Anandan claims party's corruption in governance was the cause of his death. His expulsion by Tamizhselvan splits the party, with several members creating a new one under Anandan's leadership.

Anandan uses his popular films to highlight corruption in Tamizhselvan's government and storms to power in the next election with 145/234 seats. But his governance turns out to be no different. Tamizhselvan's eloquent diatribes against misgovernance spark protests and Anandan orders his arrest with a heavy heart. Meanwhile, Anandan sees Kalpana at a disaster relief site and asks her to be brought. The car bringing her meets an accident and Kalpana dies.

Anandan is distraught over Kalpana's death. At the wedding of Ayya Veluthambi's granddaughter, a visibly ailing Anandan meets Tamizhselvan. They share a handshake but hardly talk. The next morning, Ramani finds Anandan dead in his bed. Tamizhselvan, in an emotional monologue set in a place where the two had previously planned dominating the Tamil state, recites poetry mourning his death.

Cast 

 Mohanlal as Anandan
 Prakash Raj as Tamizhselvan
 Aishwarya Rai as Pushpavalli and Kalpana
 Gautami as Ramani
 Revathi as Maragatham
 Tabu as Senthamarai
 Nassar as Ayya Veluthambi
 Kaka Radhakrishnan as Kasi
 Major Sundarrajan as Police Officer
 Rajesh as Madhivanan
 Delhi Ganesh as Nambi
 Nizhalgal Ravi as Ramani's uncle
 Kalpana Iyer as Anandan's mother
 S. N. Lakshmi as Tamizhselvan's mother
 Gowtham Sundararajan as Elango
 C. K. Saraswathi
 P. L. Narayana as Ramasamy
 Laxmi Rattan as Arjun Doss
 Sujitha as Tamizhselvan's daughter
 Vishnuvardhan as Tamizhselvan's son
 Krishna Kulasekaran as Tamizhselvan's son
 Monica as Manimegalai, Tamizhselvan's daughter
 Cheenu Mohan as Assistant director
 Madhoo in a special appearance in song "Narumugaye"

Production

Development 
In October 1995, Mani Ratnam announced that he was set to make a feature film titled Anandan featuring dialogues written by his wife Suhasini starring Mohanlal, Nana Patekar and Aishwarya Rai. Initial speculation suggested that the film would visualise the duel between Velupillai Prabhakaran and his former Liberation Tigers of Tamil Eelam deputy Mahattaya, who was executed in 1995 for an alleged plot to kill his mentor, with Aishwarya Rai reported to be playing Indira Gandhi. Mani Ratnam was quick to deny any political backdrop claiming that the film would be about the Indian movie industry, however this proved to bluff the public as the film was to be set within a political canvas. The film was later retitled Iruvar (The Duo). The idea to make a film on the lives of 1980s Tamil Nadu political icons M. G. Ramachandran and M. Karunanidhi and their influential relationship between Tamil cinema and Dravidian politics was sparked off by a conversation Mani Ratnam had with renowned Malayalam author, M. T. Vasudevan Nair.

Casting 
When interviewed about the difficulties of casting, Mani Ratnam revealed he "struggled" citing that casting "is most important as far as performance is concerned" and that "fifty per cent of the job is done if you cast correctly". Mohanlal was approached to play Anandan, a character inspired by M. G. Ramachandran and about his performance in the film, Ratnam claimed that Mohanlal had "the ability to make everything absolutely realistic with the least amount of effort". He described that debutant Aishwarya Rai, the former Miss World beauty pageant winner, who appeared in two different characters—one inspired by actress-politician J. Jayalalithaa—as a "tremendous dancer" and as "having a lot of potential". The director revealed that the only difficulty Mohanlal and Rai had was the language, with both being non-Tamil speakers, adding that the pair had to work hard over the dubbing trying to get as close to the Tamil tongue. Tabu was also signed to play an important role in the film and shot for Iruvar alongside her Tamil debut film, Kadhal Desam.

The actor to play the role of Tamizhselvan, inspired by Karunanidhi, took substantially longer to finalise with the initial choice, Nana Patekar, withdrawing after several discussions about his remuneration. Later, Mammootty was offered the role but declined, as did Kamal Haasan and Sathyaraj. Negotiations with R. Sarathkumar and Mithun Chakraborty were unsuccessful as the pair demanded a higher remuneration. Arvind Swamy was later signed on, but soon opted out after a look test, as he could not cut his hair for the role, which would have caused continuity problems for his commitment to Minsara Kanavu (1997). Ratnam also called R. Madhavan, then a small-time model, for the screen test, but left him out of the project citing that he thought his eyes looked too young for a senior role. Subsequently, Prakash Raj, who had played a small role in Ratnam's Bombay (1995), was signed up to play the character. Prakash Raj initially told Ratnam that he was unprepared to essay such a delicate role in such short notice, with Prakash Raj later revealing that Ratnam nurtured the character and brought self-confidence into the actor. Renowned for being a perfectionist, Ratnam made Prakash Raj take 25 takes for his first shot, lasting over six hours.

Filming 
The film was shot across 1996 and schedules were canned all across India from Kerala to Leh with Mohanlal stating that it was the longest duration he had shot for a film. The film was briefly stopped by the FEFSI strike of 1996, making technicians unavailable for use, but Mani Ratnam carried on filming and completed a song using only natural light. After the shooting for Iruvar was completed, Mani Ratnam asked Prakash Raj to dub in Tamil himself for the first time, with his work taking four days to complete.

Soundtrack 
The soundtrack was composed by A. R. Rahman with lyrics by Vairamuthu. It has songs ranging from pure Carnatic to Tamil folk and jazz. Rahman blended two Carnatic ragas—Naatai and Ghambeera Naatai—in "Narumugaye". "Vennila Vennila" and "Hello Mister Edhirkatchi" are based on jazz music. Rahman sampled Dave Grusin's "Memphis Stomp" for the intro of "Hello Mister Edhirkatchi". "Udal Mannukku" and "Unnodu Naan Irundha" were recitals by Arvind Swamy. Vishwa Mohan Bhatt also worked on the album, playing the Mohan veena upon Rahman's invitation.

Release 
The censors saw the film on 31 December 1996 and opined that various characters in the film reflected the personal lives of some politicians and accordingly a certificate was denied. Following the producer's protest, it was seen by an eight-member revising committee on 2 January 1997 which suggested deletion of some objectionable portions and cleared the film for U/A certification. Four dialogues from the film were subsequently cut. However the objected scenes were muted with a background playing rather than a complete muting of the scenes.

Two days before the release of the film, Dravidar Kazhagam president K. Veeramani threatened to mobilise public opinion against its screening in theatres, because he felt that it contained "objectionable" footage denigrating the Dravidian movement founded by Periyar. The politician threatened legal action, if the film was screened in theatres without removing what he perceived as the "offending" portion, but Mani Ratnam dismissed that Veeramani was making rushed conclusions without having seen the film. The film's box office performance was also hampered by the fallout from the FEFSI strike of 1997.

A month after release in February 1997, the regional chief of the censor board G. Rajasekaran brought up the issue again and referred the film to the Indian Home Office for "advice", threatening that if more scenes were not deleted, it might ultimately, lead to a law and order problem. The film was dubbed in Telugu under the title Iddaru and in Malayalam under the same name.

Reception 
The film received positive reviews from critics including by reviewers in Kalki, Indolink, The Hindu, and the Edmonton Sun.

Controversy 
Both M. Karunanidhi and J. Jayalalithaa denied the relevance of the film to their lives and never admitted to the film being a biopic.

Legacy 
Mani Ratnam named Iruvar as his best film in an interview with critic Baradwaj Rangan. Rangan also named the film the best work of Mani Ratnam, in his list “All Mani Ratnam Movies Ranked”.

The film was also noted for its vignette style of making, with many single-shot scenes, where a fluid camera setup captures the entire action.

Accolades 
National Film Awards 1997
 Best Supporting Actor – Prakash Raj
 Best Cinematography – Santosh Sivan

International honours
 Belgrade International Film Festival – Best Film in the Festival of the Auteur Films
 Toronto International Film Festival – Masters section

References

Bibliography

External links 
 

1990s political drama films
1990s Tamil-language films
1997 films
Films about actors
Films about entertainers
Films about filmmaking
Films about mass media people
Films about screenwriters
Films directed by Mani Ratnam
Films featuring a Best Supporting Actor National Film Award-winning performance
Films scored by A. R. Rahman
Films set in Chennai
Films set in the 1960s
Films shot in Chalakudy
Films shot in Madurai
Films shot in Rajasthan
Films shot in Thrissur
Films whose cinematographer won the Best Cinematography National Film Award
Indian docudrama films
Indian films based on actual events
Indian political drama films